Stanley Reneau (born February 5, 1968) is a Belizean professional football goalkeeper. During his career he was the second choice goalie for the Belize national football team. He has played as first choice keeper for Griga United based in Dangriga since 2001. He has since retired during Jul 1, 2009.

External links

Belizean footballers
Association football goalkeepers
People from Dangriga
Living people
21st-century Belizean people
1968 births